João Paulo Andrade (born 6 June 1981), known as João Paulo, is a Portuguese footballer who plays mainly as a central defender for FC Castrense.

He amassed Primeira Liga totals of 193 matches and 18 goals over nine seasons, almost all while at the service of União de Leiria (five years). He also played professionally in Romania, France and Cyprus.

Club career
A product of U.D. Leiria's youth academy, Leiria-born João Paulo was loaned to modest U.F.C.I. Tomar for 2000–01, re-joining Leiria in the following season, being coached by a young José Mourinho and quickly becoming an important first-team member, while also being called by the Portuguese under-21 side. In January 2003, having already gained the captain's armband, he was loaned to Sporting CP, but appeared sparingly for them.

After having performed solidly during the last two seasons, João Paulo was tipped to be transferred to one of the Primeira Liga greats and, in June 2006, FC Porto agreed his transfer. However, in preseason, he suffered a major knee injury that kept him out of action for several months, and went on to only serve as third or fourth option at the northerners; on two rare starts, he netted in a 3–0 win at former club Leiria and was sent off in the 2008 final of the Taça de Portugal, lost against Sporting.

In July 2008 João Paulo, alongside teammate Pitbull, was loaned to Romania's FC Rapid București, joining compatriot José Peseiro whom signed as manager. In August of the following year he moved countries again, signing a three-year deal with Le Mans UC 72 in France for about €1,5 million. He began the campaign as a starter, but eventually lost his importance after the sacking of compatriot Paulo Duarte, going on to suffer Ligue 1 relegation.

João Paulo returned to Portugal for 2010–11, joining Vitória SC. On 3 April 2011 he scored his first goal for the Guimarães-based team, netting a last-minute equaliser against former side Sporting in a 1–1 home draw.

On 2 March 2017, after four seasons in the Cypriot First Division in representation of three clubs, the 35-year-old João Paulo returned to his homeland and joined amateurs A.C. Marinhense, where he played mainly as a forward.

International career
Born in Portugal, João Paulo is of Cape Verdean descent. He represented Portugal at the 2004 UEFA European Under-21 Championship and the Summer Olympic Games in the same year. He also played for the nation's B team.

Club statistics

Honours
Porto
Primeira Liga: 2006–07, 2007–08
Taça de Portugal runner-up: 2007–08

Omonia
Cypriot Super Cup: 2012

References

External links

1981 births
Living people
People from Leiria
Portuguese footballers
Portuguese sportspeople of Cape Verdean descent
Association football defenders
Primeira Liga players
Campeonato de Portugal (league) players
U.D. Leiria players
U.F.C.I. Tomar players
Sporting CP footballers
FC Porto players
Vitória S.C. players
Liga I players
FC Rapid București players
Ligue 1 players
Le Mans FC players
Cypriot First Division players
AC Omonia players
Apollon Limassol FC players
AEL Limassol players
Portugal under-21 international footballers
Portugal B international footballers
Olympic footballers of Portugal
Footballers at the 2004 Summer Olympics
Portuguese expatriate footballers
Expatriate footballers in Romania
Expatriate footballers in France
Expatriate footballers in Cyprus
Portuguese expatriate sportspeople in Romania
Portuguese expatriate sportspeople in France
Portuguese expatriate sportspeople in Cyprus
Sportspeople from Leiria District
Portuguese people of African descent